Piano Sonata in C-sharp minor may refer to:
 Piano Sonata No. 14 (Beethoven)
 Piano Sonata in C-sharp minor, D 655 (Schubert)
 Piano Sonata in C-sharp minor (Tchaikovsky)